The Cessna Model CG-2 was an American primary glider built by the Cessna Aircraft Company in the early 1930s.

Design and development
In 1930 the Cessna Aircraft Company was suffering in the depression and downturn in the economy following the Wall Street crash. During this period people did not have the money to purchase aircraft and as such to keep the company going Clyde Cessna (principal founder of the Cessna Aircraft Company) needed a solution.

An interim solution came from Clyde's son, Eldon Cessna, who had the idea to design and build gliders. This would allow the company to produce something simple and cheap which might keep the company afloat until people could afford more advanced powered aircraft all the while keeping them interested in flying.

The result was a simple primary glider known as the Model CG-2, known internally as the Cessna Glider, model 2, which was introduced in 1930 and which was inspired by some of the German primary gliders of the era. They were marketed by Cessna via catalog at a price of $398 US Dollars ($6,966 US Dollars in 2022) together with an advertising campaign which promised that "man might fly first, without power, in safety". Another advertisement made by Cessna stated that "glider pilots will be future transport pilots".

The glider was sold crated and ready for shipment alongside an assembly manual and a bungee-based launch system. One of the reasons for the CG-2's low price was that it was sold and shipped as a kit.

The production figures for the Model CG-2 are not completely known. This is because Cessna records show that only 54 CG-2 gliders were sold, however some sources state that Cessna manufactured at least 300 CG-2 gliders though this is unconfirmed.

With the glider in production the Cessna Aircraft Company was able to stay in operation until 1932 when the company ceased operation for a period of two years.

Operational Usage 
Once the CG-2 had been assembled the glider could be launched via the bungee cord method, as supplied with the glider, or it could be towed by an automobile or airplane.

Longer flights could also be achieved by launching the glider off a hill or ridge.

Surviving Examples

There are two known examples of a CG-2 on display in a museum.

 One example is on display at the EAA Airventure Museum in Oshkosh, Wisconsin.
 A single example resides on display at the Museum of Flight in Seattle, Washington.

Variants
Cessna CPG-1 - A motorized variant using a 10 hp (7.4 kW) Cleone engine.
Cessna CS-1 - A sailplane variant.
Cessna EC-2 - A small one-seat monoplane variant.

Gallery

Specifications

References

Citations

Bibliography

External links
AirVenture Museum website
 Museum of Flight (Seattle) website

1930s United States civil trainer aircraft
CG-02
Glider aircraft
Aircraft first flown in 1930
Parasol-wing aircraft